The 2022 W Series Miami round (known for commercial reasons as W Series Miami presented by Hard Rock) was the first of seven rounds in the 2022 W Series, and took place at the Miami International Autodrome in the United States on the 7th and 8th of May 2022. The event was an undercard to the 2022 Formula One World Championship round at the same circuit.

Classification

Practice

Qualifying

Race 1

 – Marta García received a 10-second time penalty for crashing into Emma Kimiläinen.
 – Chloe Chambers and Abbie Eaton both received a 30-second time penalty for overtaking before the control line on a Safety Car restart.

Race 2

 – Nerea Martí was relegated to third place for "making more than one change of direction whilst defending Car #27 (Alice Powell) between turns 3 and 4".
 – Fabienne Wohlwend received a 5-place grid penalty for crashing into Abbie Eaton in the previous race.
 – Did not finish the race, but was classified having completed 90% of the race distance.
 – Jessica Hawkins entered the pit-lane on the penultimate lap and was unable to leave before the pit-lane closed at the chequered flag.

Championship standings

Drivers' Championship standings

Teams' Championship standings

 Note: Only the top five positions are included.

Notes

References

External links
 Official website

|- style="text-align:center"
|width="35%"|Previous race:
|width="30%"|W Series2022 season
|width="40%"|Next race:

Miami
Miami
Miami
Miami